Feng Xueling (born 3 February 1980) is a Chinese rower. She competed in the women's coxless pair event at the 2004 Summer Olympics.

References

1980 births
Living people
Chinese female rowers
Olympic rowers of China
Rowers at the 2004 Summer Olympics
Rowers from Liaoning
People from Chaoyang, Liaoning